The mineralocorticoid receptor (or MR, MLR, MCR), also known as the aldosterone receptor or nuclear receptor subfamily 3, group C, member 2,  (NR3C2) is a protein that in humans is encoded by the NR3C2 gene that is located on chromosome 4q31.1-31.2.

MR is a receptor with equal affinity for mineralocorticoids and glucocorticoids. It belongs to the nuclear receptor family where the ligand diffuses into cells, interacts with the receptor and results in a signal transduction affecting specific gene expression in the nucleus. The selective response of some tissues and organs to mineralocorticoids over glucocorticoids occurs because mineralocorticoid-responsive cells express Corticosteroid 11-beta-dehydrogenase isozyme 2, an enzyme which selectively inactivates glucocorticoids more readily than mineralocorticoids.

Function 
MR is expressed in many tissues, such as the kidney, colon, heart, central nervous system (hippocampus), brown adipose tissue and sweat glands. In epithelial tissues, its activation leads to the expression of proteins regulating ionic and water transports (mainly the epithelial sodium channel or ENaC, Na+/K+ pump, serum and glucocorticoid induced kinase or SGK1) resulting in the reabsorption of sodium, and as a consequence an increase in extracellular volume, increase in blood pressure, and an excretion of potassium to maintain a normal salt concentration in the body.

The receptor is activated by mineralocorticoids such as aldosterone and its precursor deoxycorticosterone as well as glucocorticoids like cortisol. In intact animals, the mineralocorticoid receptor is "protected" from glucocorticoids by co-localization of an enzyme, corticosteroid 11-beta-dehydrogenase isozyme 2 (a.k.a. 11β-hydroxysteroid dehydrogenase 2; 11β-HSD2), that converts cortisol to inactive cortisone.

Activation of the mineralocorticoid receptor, upon the binding of its ligand aldosterone, results in its translocation to the cell nucleus, homodimerization and binding to hormone response elements present in the promoter of some genes. This results in the complex recruitment of the transcriptional machinery and the transcription into mRNA of the DNA sequence of the activated genes.

An activating mutation in the NR3C2 gene (S810L) results in constitutive activity of the mineralocorticoid receptor, leading to severe early-onset hypertension that is exacerbated by pregnancy. In a family known to harbor the S810L mutation, 3 individuals carrying the mutation died of chronic heart failure before age 50. Additional studies have shown that this activated version of MR can positively respond to ligands that are traditionally antagonists, such as endogenous hormones like progesterone, and the diuretic drugs spironolactone and eplerenone.

Ligands
Aldosterone, 11-deoxycorticosterone, and cortisol are endogenous agonists of the MR. Fludrocortisone is a synthetic agonist of the MR which is used clinically. Progesterone is a potent endogenous antagonist of the MR. Synthetic antagonists of the MR include the steroidal compounds spironolactone, canrenone, eplerenone, and drospirenone and the nonsteroidal compounds apararenone, esaxerenone, and finerenone.

Interactions 

Mineralocorticoid receptor has been shown to interact with:

 Glucocorticoid receptor and
 TRIM24.

See also 
 Aldosterone
 Glucocorticoid
 Mineralocorticoid

References

Further reading

External links 
 

Human proteins
3